This article a list of Progresso da Lunda Sul players. Progresso da Lunda Sul is an Angolan association football (soccer) club based in Saurimo, and plays at the Estádio das Mangueiras.  The club was established in 2002.

2014–2018
Progresso da Lunda Sul players 2014–2018

References

Progresso da Lunda Sul
Progresso da Lunda Sul players
Association football player non-biographical articles